The Dachou class range support vessel/target ship (AGT)/torpedo retriever (TR/TRW) is a class of little known auxiliary ship built in the People's Republic of China (PRC) for the People's Liberation Army Navy (PLAN). Designed as a successor of earlier Type 917 torpedo retriever (TR/TWR)/target ship (AGT), the exact domestic Chinese type designation remains unknown, and this class is identified by its NATO reporting name Dachou class, or 大筹 in Chinese, meaning "big plan". Specification:
Length: 

The Dachou class in PLAN service is designated by a combination of two Chinese characters followed by a three-digit number. The second Chinese character is Yun (运), meaning Transport in Chinese, indicating that in addition to range support and targeting missions, this class is also used as transport (AP), though some modification work is required to remove onboard range support and targeting equipment before it can be used to transport cargoes. The first Chinese character denotes which fleet the ship is service with, with East (Dong, 东) for East Sea Fleet, North (Bei, 北) for North Sea Fleet, and South (Nan, 南) for South Sea Fleet. However, the pennant numbers are subject to change due to changes of Chinese naval ships naming convention, or when units are transferred to different fleets. As of 2022, a total of four ships have been identified:

References

Auxiliary ships of the People's Liberation Army Navy
Ships of the People's Liberation Army Navy